A Tab in the Ocean is the second album from German-based English progressive rock band Nektar.

English heavy metal band Iron Maiden covered the song "King of Twilight", also mixing in parts of "Crying in the Dark" creating somewhat of a medley, and released as a b-side to the 1984 single "Aces High".

Track listing

All songs written and arranged by Nektar.

2004 reissue

2013 reissue
Double CD reissue.  Disc one as 2004 reissue above, with both 1972 and 1976 album mixes.  The bonus disc two includes more songs from the same "Official Bootleg" 1971 show released on the bonus disc of the 2013 reissue of Journey to the Centre of the Eye, plus a live in the studio track from 1973.

Personnel
Nektar
Roye Albrighton – guitars, lead vocals
Mick Brockett – lighting, projections and visual effects
Allan Freeman – keyboards, backing vocals, Mellotron
Derek "Mo" Moore – bass, backing vocals
Ron Howden – drums, percussion

Production
Peter Hauke – production
Dieter Dierks – engineering

References

External links
 A Tab in the Ocean at TheNektarProject.com

Nektar albums
1972 albums